On 1 May 2018, two suicide bombers detonated their explosives at a mosque and a market in the town of Mubi in the state of Adamawa in eastern Nigeria, killing at least 86 people and injuring 58 others. The blasts were carried out by young boys and happened shortly after 1:00 pm (12:00 GMT). No group claimed responsibility for the attack, but the blame was attributed to the Boko Haram Islamist extremist group.

Major attacks had occurred in Mubi in 2012, 2014 and 2017.

References 

2018 murders in Nigeria
2010s massacres in Nigeria

Attacks on religious buildings and structures in Nigeria
Boko Haram bombings
Crime in Adamawa State
Boko Haram mosque bombings
Marketplace attacks
Mass murder in 2018
May 2018 crimes in Africa
May 2018 events in Nigeria
2018 suicide bombings
Suicide bombings in 2018
Suicide bombings in Nigeria
Terrorist incidents in Nigeria in 2018
Massacres perpetrated by Boko Haram